Josep Franch Xargay (1 August 1943 – 19 May 2021) was a Spanish professional footballer who played as a defender.

Career
Born in Santa Cristina d'Aro, Franch played for Banyoles, Figueres, Girona, Badalona, Barcelona and Sabadell.

After retiring from football he worked in construction and hospitality, before dying in a hospital in Barcelona on 19 May 2021, aged 77.

References

1943 births
2021 deaths
People from Baix Empordà
Sportspeople from the Province of Girona
Spanish footballers
Association football defenders
UE Figueres footballers
Girona FC players
CF Badalona players
FC Barcelona players
CE Sabadell FC footballers
Segunda División players
La Liga players